National Airways Corporation is a commercial aviation company with its head office on the grounds of Lanseria Airport in Johannesburg, South Africa. The company offers a range of products and services for fixed-wing aircraft and helicopter markets, including aircraft sales, maintenance, parts, value-added products, aircraft charter, international operations, and pilot training. NAC Operations is the flight operations and charter division. NAC operates a South African network of offices, its main base is Lanseria Airport, with office hubs at Cape Town's V&A Waterfront, Durban, Ultimate Heliport in Midrand and Rand Airport. NAC also has shareholding in Discovery Jets based in Fort Lauderdale, USA.

History 
The general aviation company was established in 1946 and started operations on 25 May 1946 as National Air Charters and in 1962 acquired United Air Services; the following year National Air Charter was renamed to National Airways Corporation (NAC)
In 1986 NAC acquired Wings Airways and united with Namakwaland Lugdiens.

On 1 July 1999, Imperial Holdings, a mobility group listed on the Johannesburg Stock Exchange, purchased 62% NAC share.

In 2011, Naturelink Aviation was merged into National Airways Corporation.

The company is owned by a consortium of shareholders, including the Directors of NAC."/>

Dealerships and representation 

NAC is an authorised dealer and representative for a variety of manufacturers and service providers in the aviation industry.

Aircraft manufacturers

Dassault Aviation
Bell Helicopter
Robinson Helicopter
Piper Aircraft
Quest Kodiak

Charter Fleet 

As of February 2023 the National Airways charter fleet includes:

{| class="toccolours" border="1" cellpadding="3" style="white-space:nowrap; border-collapse:collapse; margin:auto;"
|+ National Airways Fleet
|- bgcolor=lightblue
! Aircraft
! In Fleet
! Notes
|-
|Boeing 737-500
|align="center"|
|
|-
|Global XRS
|align="center"|
|
|-
|Gulfstream G550
|align="center"|
|
|-
|Gulfstream 650ER
|align="center"|
|
|-
|Falcon 7X
|align="center"|
|
|-
|Hawker 4000
|align="center"|
|
|-
|Challenger 350
|align="center"|
|
|-
|Bombardier Learjet 60
|align="center"|
|
|-
|Bombardier Learjet 45XR
|align="center"|
|
|-
|Hawker 800XP
|align="center"|
| 
|-
|Citation Mustang
|align="center"|
|
|-
|Learjet 35A
|align="center"|
|
|-
|King Air 200
|align="center"|
|
|-
|B1900D
|align="center"|
|
|-
|Embraer 120
|align="center"|
|
|-
|PC12
|align="center"|
|
|-
|Cessna 208B
|align="center"|
|
|-
|Cessna 402C
|align="center"|
|

References

Aviation companies
Companies of South Africa
Commercial aviation